Sterling Island is a man-made island in River Raisin, near Lake Erie. It is in Monroe County, Michigan.

See also
Sisters Island (Michigan)
Strong Island (Michigan)

References

Islands of Monroe County, Michigan